Ptychites is an extinct genus of cephalopods belonging to the family Ptychitidae. These nektonic carnivores lived during the Triassic period, from Anisian to Ladinian age.

Species
 Ptychites besnosovi Shevyrev 1995
 Ptychites densistriatus Bucher 1992
 Ptychites domatus Silberling and Tozer 1968
 Ptychites evansi Smith 1914
 Ptychites gradinarui Bucher 1992
 Ptychites guloensis Tozer 1994
 Ptychites hamatus Tozer 1994
 Ptychites miyagiensis Bando 1964
 Ptychites nipponicus Bando 1964
 Ptychites oppeli Mojsisovic 1882
 Ptychites opulentus Mojsisovics 1882
 Ptychites pseudoeuglyphus Konstantinov 1991
 Ptychites stachei Mojsisovics 1882
 Ptychites trochleaeformis Lindstroem 1865
 Ptychites wrighti McLearn 1946

Description
Species in this genus are quite variable in form, ranging from subglobose to laterally compressed. The surface of the shell  is sculptured with low folds.

Distribution
Fossils of species within this genus have been found in the Triassic of Afghanistan, Austria, Canada, China, Hungary, Italy, Japan, Malaysia, Oman, Papua New Guinea, Russia, Tunisia, Turkey, United States.

References

Mikko's Phylogeny Archive

Ptychitaceae
Triassic ammonites
Ceratitida genera
Ammonites of Europe
Ammonites of North America
Anisian life
Anisian genus first appearances
Ladinian genus extinctions